Marsilea vestita, the hairy water-clover, is a species of largely aquatic fern in the family Marsileaceae. It is native to western and central North America, the Bahamas, Barbuda, and Peru. It can grow into a water form or a land form, depending on local conditions.

References

vestita
Freshwater plants
Flora of British Columbia
Flora of Alberta
Flora of Saskatchewan
Flora of the Northwestern United States
Flora of North Dakota
Flora of South Dakota
Flora of Nebraska
Flora of Kansas
Flora of Oklahoma
Flora of Minnesota
Flora of Iowa
Flora of the Southwestern United States
Flora of the South-Central United States
Flora of Arkansas
Flora of Louisiana
Flora of Mississippi
Flora of Alabama
Flora of Florida
Flora of Northwestern Mexico
Flora of Northeastern Mexico
Flora of Southwestern Mexico
Flora of Central Mexico
Flora of the Bahamas
Flora of Antigua and Barbuda
Flora of Peru
Plants described in 1830
Flora without expected TNC conservation status